Iberis umbellata, common name garden candytuft or globe candytuft, is a herbaceous annual flowering plant of the genus Iberis and the family Brassicaceae.

Etymology
The genus name derives from "Iberia", the ancient name of Spain, while the species epithet comes from the Latin "umbel", meaning "umbrella" and refers to the shape of the inflorescence.

Description
The biological form of Iberis umbellata is hemicryptophyte scapose, as its overwintering buds are situated just below the soil surface and the floral axis is more or less erect with a few leaves.

The stem is twisted at the base while the flowering branches are erect and leafy. The flowers are in umbel-shaped corymbs. The calyx is violet and the corolla is composed of four white, pink or purple petals. The flowering period extends from May through June. The flowers are hermaphroditic and pollinated by bees and butterflies.

Distribution
This species is native to the Mediterranean region. It is present in most of Europe, especially along the coasts, from Spain to Greece and in northern America.

Habitat

Gallery

References

 The International Plant Name List
 Acta Plantarum
 Plants for a future

External links

 Biolib
 USDA

umbellata
Plants described in 1753
Taxa named by Carl Linnaeus